Mark W. Denny (born 1951) is a professor of biology at Stanford University.

His research on the intertidal zone of wave-swept shores has led to increased understanding of this habitat. His most publicized research is his work on locomotion of water striders, which led to the coining of the term "Denny's paradox" to explain a discrepancy between physics and previous understanding of how surface-dwelling animals such as these insects move.

In 2008 he examined greyhounds, thoroughbred horses and human athletes trying to find their maximum running speed. He predicted the fastest possible time for men's 100 metres will be 9.48 seconds.

Books 
Denny is the author of several books, including:
Biology and the Mechanics of Wave-Swept Shores (1985)
Air and Water (1993)
Chance in Biology: Using Probability to Explore Nature (with Steven Gaines) (2002)
Conversations With Marco Polo: The Remarkable Life of Eugene C. Haderlie (with Joanna L. Nelson) (2006)
How the Ocean Works: An Introduction to Oceanography (2008)

Editor:
Encyclopedia of Tidepools and Rocky Shores (with Steven Gaines) (2007)

References 

1951 births
Living people
21st-century American biologists
Stanford University faculty
Place of birth missing (living people)